Paul F. Bikle (5 June 1916 – 19 January 1991) was director of the U.S. National Aeronautics and Space Administration (NASA) Dryden Flight Research Facility from 1959 until 1971, and author of more than 40 technical publications. He was associated with major aeronautical research programs including the hypersonic X-15 rocket plane, and was a world record-setting glider pilot.

Civilian career

Before graduating from the University of Detroit in 1939 with a BSc. degree in aeronautical engineering, Bikle's activity in the student chapter of the Institute of the Aeronautical Sciences (IAS), and the school gliding and flying clubs, led to flight instruction and a pilot's license from the C.A.A., the predecessor to the FAA. He later became a fellow in the American Institute of Aeronautics and Astronautics, the successor to the IAS. Mr. Bikle worked for Taylorcraft Aircraft in Ohio before beginning his government service career.

Air Force career

His career with the U.S. Air Force began in 1940 when he was appointed an aeronautical engineer at Wright Field. In 1944 he was named Chief of the Aerodynamics Branch in the Flight Test Division there. While working closely with other government agencies in establishing the first flying qualities specifications for aircraft, he also wrote AAF Technical Report 50693 Flight Test Methods, which was used as a standard manual for conducting flight tests for more than five years. During the World War II years he was involved in more than 30 test projects and flew over 1,200 hours as an engineering observer.

In 1947 Bikle was appointed Chief of the Performance Engineering Branch, and directed tests of the XB-43 Jetmaster, the first U.S. jet bomber; the Convair XC-99, and the North American F-86A Sabre. With the transfer of this part of the flight test mission to the newly formed Air Force Flight Test Center at Edwards AFB, he advanced to Assistant Chief of the Flight Test Engineering Laboratory in 1951.

NASA career

Paul Bikle was technical director of the Air Force Flight Test Center at Edwards Air Force Base in September 1959, when he was named Director of the NASA Flight Research Center (FRC) at Edwards, California. In July 1962 he was awarded the NASA Medal for Outstanding Leadership for his part in directing flight operations and research activities on the highly successful rocket-powered X-15 program. After Paul's retirement on 31 May 1971, The FRC became the Dryden Flight Research Center in 1976.

During his nearly 12 years with NASA he was responsible for several major aeronautical research programs, including those involving the X-15, the supersonic XB-70, the fleet of wingless lifting bodies that contributed to development of the Space Shuttles, and the Lunar Landing Research Vehicle that paved the way for successful Moon landings by Project Apollo astronauts.

Just before Christmas 1961 Paul Bikle gave a directive to Charles Richard to quickly and cheaply design and build what would become the template for the Rogallo wing used for a high percentage of modern hang gliders. Following successful test flying of the Paresev (paraglider research vehicle), many prospective hang glider pilots made their own hang gliders with various fuselage solutions; including the use of the triangle control bar, parallel-bar, full-cockpit, tri-cycle undercarriage and powered hang-gliders. Paul Bikle's directive synergistically birthed a wing that would dramatically change personal aviation in powered and un-powered forms.

Soaring
Bikle was a veteran of 23 years of soaring, and was president of the Soaring Society of America (SSA). Both marks were certified by the National Aeronautic Association, and the Fédération Aéronautique Internationale. Bikle still holds the record for height gain. He became a member of the Soaring Hall of Fame in 1960 and was awarded the FAI Lilienthal Gliding Medal, the highest award in international soaring, in 1962.

While director of the Dryden Flight Research Facility, Bikle designed and completed his own sailplane, the Bikle T-6, flying it to fifth place in the 1970 US Nationals.

Other soaring accomplishments
 Barringer Trophy 1952, 1953, 1954, 1955, 1956
 U.S. Diamond badge #3 (International #7) 1953;
 Symons Three Lennie award #11
 Eaton Trophy 1964
 Tissandier Diploma 1968
 Tuntland Award 1970, 1971
 OSTIV Plaque/Klemperer Award 1972
 World/National Competition
 Smirnoff Derby
 Sailplane Performance Studies/Tests

References

External links 
 NASA X-15 Biography
 NASA Dryden Home > Collections > Photo Home > Directors > Photo # E-4875
 Soaring Hall of Fame Biographies

1916 births
1991 deaths
Aviators from Pennsylvania
American aviation writers
Aviation pioneers
Gliding in the United States
American glider pilots
Glider flight record holders
American aviation record holders
United States Army Air Forces personnel of World War II
People from Wilkinsburg, Pennsylvania
University of Detroit Mercy alumni
Lilienthal Gliding Medal recipients
20th-century American non-fiction writers